is a Japanese manga by Natsumi Matsumoto, who also created Yumeiro Patissiere. It was serialized in Ribon from October 1999 through April 2003. The individual chapters were collected and published in eight volumes  by Shueisha. The series focuses on childhood friends Momoka and Ryuga, after Momoka is possessed by a dragon while protecting Ryuga. It is followed by a sequel series titled  which focuses on Momoko and Ryuga's daughter, Anjuu Sendou.

The series is licensed for English language release in North America by Viz Media, who released the first volume on December 2, 2008 and the final volume on September 7, 2010.

Release
While both of the series were published by Shueisha in Japan and Tokyopop in Germany, St. Dragon Girl was also published in North America by Viz Media.

Volume list

St. Dragon Girl

St. Dragon Girl Miracle

Reception
Leroy Douresseaux of the Comic Book Bin claims that the use of magic in the series "energizes what could have been standard fare". He also claims that the mixture of "typically super-pretty shojo manga art with demon-fighting" is a "fun read". He also likens the series to a root beer float, "At some point, you might be too old to have such a really sweet treat in an extra-large size, but it is still sooooo good". Several times, he said that although the series was intended for younger girls, it would also appeal older readers. Deb Aoki of About.com considered this as a perfect series for tweens with "charming art, simple stories and chaste romance." Ed Sizemore of Manga Worth Reading felt that Matsumoto managed to create a cast of wholesome people that aren't boring", but was frustrated by the main characters' refusal to admit their mutual attraction to each another. Anime News Network's Carlo Santos disliked the first volume, considering it episodic and formulaic nature, similar to other high school romances, and having ordinary art work.

References

External links
 

1999 manga
2003 manga
Comedy anime and manga
Fantasy anime and manga
Shōjo manga
Shueisha manga
Shueisha franchises
Tokyopop titles
Viz Media manga